Gajanpur is a village and a Panchayat in Dewas district in the Indian state of Madhya Pradesh. Gajanpur Village is a major agricultural production area in Madhya Pradesh. In the 2011 Census of India, its population was reported as 367.

References 

Villages in Dewas district